Pierre Auguste Roques  (28 December 1856 – 26 February 1920) was a French general and creator of the French air force.

Biography
Born to a modest family in Marseillan, Hérault, his lively intelligence earned him a study grant that allowed him to prepare for the entrance examinations to the École Polytechnique. He entered the École Polytechnique in 1877 and became a friend of Joseph Joffre. Having chosen the military engineering branch of the army he was commissioned as an officer in 1879 (at that time, more engineering than military). During his colonial campaigns, he created a vast number of structures (railways, bridges, roads) in Tonkin, Algeria and, above all, in Madagascar. According to historians, this island owes a large part of its infrastructure to Roques. By 1906, Roques had been promoted to the rank of général de brigade.

As Director of Engineering, Roques was preoccupied from 1906 with the management of the new air service. He was the founder and organiser of French military aviation, and was appointed the Permanent Inspector of Military Aeronautics in 1910. The 1911 aeroplane contest in Reims - the world's first - was intended to allow the French military to evaluate and buy 'scientifically' its first aeroplanes. Roques decided the établissements d'aéronautique (aeronautical establishments) should be called escadrilles (squadrons) and aéroplanes should henceforth be called avions, after the name chosen by Clément Ader for his own aircraft and in homage to this visionary engineer with whom he corresponded regularly. It was also Roques who initiated the carnet de vol (pilot's log book) system, still in use today. The names introduced by Roques quickly came to be generally accepted as part of the French lexicon.

At the outbreak of the First World War, he was the commanding general of the 12th Corps. By January 1915 he had become the commander of the First Army.

Roques was appointed Minister of War in March 1916 after it had been ensured that the Commander-in-Chief Joffre, who had been criticised by the previous incumbent General Gallieni, had no objection to his appointment. Roques was sent on a fact-finding mission to Salonika after Britain, Italy and Russia had pushed for the dismissal of Sarrail, the theatre commander. To the surprise of Prime Minister Briand and Joffre, Roques returned recommending that Sarrail's forces be built up to thirty divisions ready for an attack on Bulgaria. He did not specifically praise Sarrail, but recommended that Sarrail no longer report to Joffre. Coming on the back of the disappointing results of the Somme campaign and the defeat of Romania, Roques’ report further discredited Briand and Joffre and began the political manoeuvres which led to Joffre's removal. On 13 December Briand formed a new government, replacing Roques with Lyautey.

Subsequently, Roques served briefly as the commander of the Fourth Army and then as the Inspector General of Works and Organization for the French Army until February 1919.

His war service exhausted him and he died at Saint-Cloud in 1920. Buried initially in his native Marseillan, his remains were transferred to the Hôtel des Invalides in Paris.

Awards
1912  -  Grand Officier de la Légion d'honneur
1916  -  le Grand Croix de la Légion d'honneur
1920  -  Médaille militaire  -  Épée d'honneur de la ville de Marseillan

References

Books
 

|-

|-

|-

|-

|-

|-

|-

1856 births
1920 deaths
People from Marseillan, Hérault
French Air Force generals
French military personnel of World War I
École Polytechnique alumni
Aviation in France
Aviation pioneers
Grand Croix of the Légion d'honneur
Grand Officiers of the Légion d'honneur
French Ministers of War